Benjamin James Austin, OAM  (born 7 November 1980) is an Australian Elite Athlete with a Disability (EAD) swimmer. His classification is S8 (above elbow amputee).

Early life
Austin was born on 7 November 1980 in the New South Wales town of Wellington. He is Aboriginal via his maternal grandmother. When he was a few weeks old, doctors amputated his left arm above the elbow due to birth-related complications. Outside of swimming, he plays rugby league, rugby union, water polo and basketball. He is a university student, working on a degree that will allow him to become an English as a Second Language teacher. He is also studying kinesiology. He currently resides in Sydney, Australia. He has four sisters.

Swimming

Austin started swimming at five years of age, and began swimming competitively in 1996. He  represented Australia for the first time in 1999.  While he is primarily known for being a Paralympic swimmer, he also competed in abled bodied swimming. He swims for Warringah Aquatic and is coached by Ben Davies. In 2008, he was coached by Graeme Carroll. He was an Australian Institute of Sport scholarship holder.

He has competed at the 2000 Summer Paralympics, the 2004 Summer Paralympics and the 2008 Summer Paralympics. At the 2000 Games, he won a silver medal in the 200 m individual medley, and two bronze medals in the 100 m butterfly and 4x100 m medley relay events. He went into the Sydney 2000 Games ranked number one for the 200m individual medley and held top 5 rankings in both the 100m and 50m freestyle and butterfly events. At the 2004 Games, he won two gold medals in the 100 m freestyle and 4×100 m medley events, for which he received a Medal of the Order of Australia, three silver medals in the 100 m butterfly, 200 m individual medley, and 4×100 m freestyle relay events, and a bronze medal in the 4x100 m freestyle relay. He set two world records at the 2004 Paralympic Games in the 100 m freestyle and 100 m butterfly events. At the 2008 Games, he won a gold medal in the Men's 4x100 m Medley 34 pts relay and a silver medal in the 4x100 m freestyle relay. He finished in fifth place in the 100 m butterfly event, and fourth in the 100 m freestyle event.

He competed at the IPC Swimming World Championships in 2002 and 2006. At the 2008 Australian Championships, he set a personal best time in the 100 m Freestyle event with a time of 0:59.08.

Austin became a pioneer of Australian swimming and he did this by bridging the gap of respect, recognition and equality to the Paralympic swimming movement in Australia, through his inspiring achievements and growing public profile.

Ben became the first Paralympic Telstra Dolphins Ambassador and also the first Paralympic ambassador for Austswim.

2002 Manchester Commonwealth Games
Austin set two world records at the 2006 Commonwealth Games.

2006 Melbourne Commonwealth Games
Austin set six world records at the 2006 Commonwealth Games.

References

1980 births
Living people
Sportsmen from New South Wales
Australian amputees
Male Paralympic swimmers of Australia
Swimmers at the 2000 Summer Paralympics
Swimmers at the 2004 Summer Paralympics
Swimmers at the 2006 Commonwealth Games
Swimmers at the 2010 Commonwealth Games
Medalists at the 2000 Summer Paralympics
Medalists at the 2004 Summer Paralympics
Medalists at the 2008 Summer Paralympics
Paralympic gold medalists for Australia
Paralympic silver medalists for Australia
Paralympic bronze medalists for Australia
Commonwealth Games gold medallists for Australia
Amputee category Paralympic competitors
World record holders in paralympic swimming
Recipients of the Medal of the Order of Australia
Australian Institute of Sport Paralympic swimmers
Indigenous Australian Paralympians
S8-classified Paralympic swimmers
Commonwealth Games medallists in swimming
Paralympic medalists in swimming
Australian male freestyle swimmers
Australian male breaststroke swimmers
Australian male medley swimmers
Medallists at the 2010 Commonwealth Games